June Dhule, also called Old Dhule, is the heart of Dhule, India under Dhule district.  June Dhule is situated in the valley of the Panzara River, the holy river named after the goddess Panzara. The language spoken at June Dhule is Ahirani and Marathi.  The business place is Subhash Nagar.

References

Cities and towns in Dhule district